was a Japanese politician and activist. Kihira was a member of the House of Councilors in Japan. She was involved in the League of Women Voters of Japan where she served in different capacities including vice chair and president of the group.

Biography 
Kihira grew up on Kyushu. When she was a student, she became a secretary to Fusae Ichikawa. In 1951, she was involved in an anti-corruption campaign. Kihira took over as the chair of the League of Women Voters of Japan in 1971. In 1989, she became a member of the House of Councilors. She served on the Parliament until 1995, where she again returned to working with the League of Women Voters of Japan.

Kihira died in 2015 of heart failure.

References 

1928 births
2015 deaths
20th-century Japanese women politicians
20th-century Japanese politicians
Japanese activists
Japanese women activists
Female members of the House of Councillors (Japan)
Members of the House of Councillors (Japan)